South Cascade Lake is a glacial lake in Washington.  It is the source of the South Fork Cascade River.  It is fed directly by the meltwater of the South Cascade Glacier.

External links

Lakes of Washington (state)
Lakes of Skagit County, Washington
North Cascades of Washington (state)
Mount Baker-Snoqualmie National Forest
Protected areas of Skagit County, Washington